The 1986 NBA draft was held on June 17, 1986.

Overview and aftermath
This draft holds the record for the most players (out of prospects chosen) who later debuted in the NBA, with 66.

Drug and health issues involving drafted players
There were various drug-related problems that plagued players in the 1986 NBA draft. Most notable was the death of highly touted Len Bias. Bias died less than two days after being selected second overall by the defending champion Boston Celtics. His death was ruled an overdose that resulted from the abuse of the drug cocaine. Other problems involving drugs hampered the careers of Chris Washburn, Roy Tarpley, and William Bedford.

Successful second-round players
While a number of first-round selections were unable to make an impact in the league, this draft did feature a number of talented second-round selections. Dennis Rodman, who became one of the leading defenders and rebounders in NBA history, was inducted into the Naismith Memorial Basketball Hall of Fame in August 2011. Mark Price, Kevin Duckworth, and Jeff Hornacek also went on to have successful careers, and each made the NBA All-Star Game. Three others – Johnny Newman, Nate McMillan, and David Wingate – had long, productive careers as role players.

International draftees
This draft contained two exceptional international players, both of whom had shortened careers for unusual reasons. Third-round selection Dražen Petrović was coming off an All-Star caliber fourth season when he was killed in an automobile accident in 1993. He has since been elected to both the Naismith Hall of Fame and the FIBA Hall of Fame. The other, Arvydas Sabonis, was not permitted to play in the United States because of the dangerous political climate in the Soviet Union. He won two Olympic medals before his arrival in the NBA—a gold in 1988 with the USSR, and a bronze in 1992 with Lithuania. 

After the dissolution of the Soviet Union in 1991, Sabonis had a very successful career in Europe before finally joining the Portland Trail Blazers in 1995. Sabonis had lost much of his mobility by the time he joined the team because of a string of knee and Achilles tendon injuries. He finished second in both the Sixth Man Award and Rookie of the Year voting; after the 1995–96 season, he won a second Olympic bronze medal with Lithuania. He played seven seasons with Portland before returning to his homeland of Lithuania where he finished his career. Sabonis entered the FIBA Hall in 2010 and the Naismith Hall in 2011.

Other draftee contributions to the game
This draft is also known for the number of players who made important contributions to the sport of basketball outside of the court. For example, Nate McMillan had a highly successful run with the Seattle SuperSonics as a player and then as head coach, and then spent seven seasons as head coach of the Portland Trail Blazers. Scott Skiles was the former coach of the Milwaukee Bucks and also the first coach to lead the Chicago Bulls to the playoffs in the post-Jordan era. 

Larry Krystkowiak, a former Bucks head coach, was hired in April 2011 as the new head coach at the University of Utah. John Salley won four championship rings with three different NBA teams (Detroit Pistons, Chicago Bulls and Los Angeles Lakers) before becoming one of the hosts of The Best Damn Sports Show Period on Fox Sports Network. Mark Price served as an assistant coach at Georgia Tech, a shooting consultant with Memphis (one season) and Atlanta (two seasons), a shooting coach for Golden State (one season), and in December 2011 was named Player Development Coach for the Orlando Magic. 

Jeff Hornacek would also be a full-time assistant head coach for the Utah Jazz for two seasons before accepting a job as the head coach for the Phoenix Suns in the 2013–14 NBA season. In 2016, Jeff Hornacek became the head coach for the New York Knicks, and coached them until 2018. Pete Myers, selected in the sixth round as the 120th overall pick, was an assistant coach for the Chicago Bulls from 2001 to 2010 and Golden State Warriors since 2011. Jim Les, the 70th overall pick, was an assistant coach for the WNBA's Sacramento Monarchs from 1999 to 2001 then was head coach at Bradley University from 2002 to 2011 and UC Davis since 2011.

Jay Bilas, who was selected in the fifth round as the 108th overall pick but never played in the NBA, is an ESPN college basketball analyst.

Draft selections

Notable post-second round picks
These players selected after the second round have played at least one game in the NBA.

* compensation for draft choices traded away by Ted Stepien

Notable undrafted players
These players who declared or were automatically eligible for the 1986 draft were not selected but played in the NBA.

Early entrants

College underclassmen
The following college basketball players successfully applied for early draft entrance.

  William Bedford – C, Memphis (junior)
  Walter Berry – F, St. John's (junior)
  Michael Graham – F, Georgetown (freshman)
  Jerald Hyatt – G, Lincoln Memorial (junior)
  Andre Morgan – G, Hawaii (junior)
  Chris Washburn – F/C, NC State (sophomore)
  Dwayne Washington – Syracuse (junior)
  John Williams – F, LSU (sophomore)

Other eligible players

See also
 List of first overall NBA draft picks

References

External links
 SI.com's twenty-year retrospective on the 1986 NBA Draft 

Draft
National Basketball Association draft
NBA draft
NBA draft
1980s in Manhattan
Basketball in New York City
Sporting events in New York City
Sports in Manhattan
Madison Square Garden